Taq Rezaleh-ye Mohammad Aqa (also Romanized as Ţāq Rezāleh-ye Moḩammad Āqā; also known as Ţāq-e Reẕāleh and Ţāq-e Reẕālī) is a village in Afrineh Rural District, Mamulan District, Pol-e Dokhtar County, Lorestan Province, Iran. At the 2006 census, its population was 130, in 21 families.

References 

Towns and villages in Pol-e Dokhtar County